The World Group was the highest level of Federation Cup competition in 1994. Thirty-two nations competed in a five-round knockout competition from 18 to 24 July. Spain was the defending champion, and they successfully defended their title defeating United States in the final.

Participating teams

Draw

First round

Spain vs. Chile

Cuba vs. Argentina

Belgium vs. Sweden

China vs. Japan

Finland vs. Slovakia

Germany vs. Colombia

South Africa vs. Paraguay

Belarus vs. Netherlands

France vs. South Korea

Italy vs. Denmark

Chinese Taipei vs. Indonesia

Croatia vs. Bulgaria

United States vs. Czech Republic

Canada vs. Switzerland

Austria vs. Poland

Latvia vs. Australia

Second round

Spain vs. Argentina

Sweden vs. Japan

Slovakia vs. Germany

South Africa vs. Netherlands

France vs. Italy

Indonesia vs. Bulgaria

United States vs. Canada

Austria vs. Australia

Quarterfinals

Spain vs. Japan

Germany vs. South Africa

France vs. Bulgaria

United States vs. Austria

Semifinals

Spain vs. Germany

France vs. United States

Final

Spain vs. United States

References

External links
 Fed Cup website

World Group
Tennis tournaments in Germany
Sports competitions in Frankfurt
1994 in German tennis